Pure Country is the soundtrack album to the 1992 film of the same name, and the thirteenth studio album by American country music singer George Strait. The film stars Strait as fictional country singer Dusty Chandler, and the album consists mostly of songs sung by Dusty in the film. The Pure Country soundtrack is Strait's first soundtrack album. It was released in 1992 by MCA Records.

Although the film was a mild success, garnering box office receipts of over $15 million against a $10 million budget, the film's soundtrack album is Strait's most commercially successful album, having sold over six million copies.

Content
This was the first album of Strait's career to feature Tony Brown, who produced all of Strait's subsequent albums, until Cold Beer Conversation (2015). Strait and Brown produced the entire album except for the main title sequence version of "Heartland", which was produced by Steve Dorff.

Music videos were made for "I Cross My Heart" and "Heartland". Both of these songs were Number One hits for Strait on the Billboard country charts, and "When Did You Stop Loving Me" (which was later recorded by George Jones on his 1998 album It Don't Get Any Better Than This) was a #6 hit. "Overnight Male", originally recorded by B.B. Watson on his 1991 debut album Light at the End of the Tunnel, also charted at #72 from unsolicited airplay. "Last in Love" was originally recorded by J.D. Souther on his 1979 album, You're Only Lonely.  "The King of Broken Hearts" and "Where the Sidewalk Ends" were written or co-written and originally recorded by Jim Lauderdale on his album, Planet of Love. The former was later recorded by Mark Chesnutt on his 1995 album Wings, and by Lee Ann Womack on her 2008 album Call Me Crazy. The latter was also recorded by Jann Browne on her 1991 album, It Only Hurts When I Laugh.

Track listing

Personnel

 Eddie Bayers – drums
 Pat Coil – piano
 George Doering – acoustic guitar
 Glen Duncan – fiddle
 Stuart Duncan – fiddle
 Buddy Emmons – steel guitar
 Pat Flynn – acoustic guitar
 Sonny Garrish – steel guitar
 Steve Gibson – electric guitar
 Emory Gordy, Jr. – bass guitar
 Richard Greene – fiddle
 Owen Hale – drums
 David Hungate – bass guitar
 John Barlow Jarvis – piano
 Doug Livingston – steel guitar
 Liana Manis – background vocals
 Brent Mason – electric guitar
 Steve Nathan – piano
 Dean Parks – electric guitar
 John "J.R." Robinson – drums
 Brent Rowan – electric guitar
 Randy Scruggs – acoustic guitar
 Neil Steubenhaus – bass guitar
 Harry Stinson – background vocals
 Bubba Strait – vocals on "Heartland (Main Title Sequence)"
 George Strait – lead vocals
 Glenn Worf – bass guitar
 Curtis Young – background vocals
 Andrea Zonn – background vocals

Strings conducted and arranged by Steve Dorff.

Chart positions

Weekly charts

Year-end charts

Singles

Certifications

References

1992 soundtrack albums
George Strait soundtracks
MCA Records soundtracks
Albums produced by Tony Brown (record producer)
Drama film soundtracks
Musical film soundtracks